Marie Jaisson is a sociologist studying the sociology of medical practices and of biological phenomena, and the history of Sociology. After a Ph.D. in Sociology at EHESS (Paris), she was junior professor at the [University of Tours] and she is full professor at the University Sorbonne Paris-Nord (France).

External links
 Marie Jaisson's information blog.

Main publications
 Le Sexisme de la première heure. Hasard et sociologie, with Eric Brian. Paris, Raisons d'agir, 2007. 
 The Descent of Human Sex Ratio at Birth. A Dialogue between Mathematics, Biology and Sociology, with Eric Brian. Dordrecht, Springer Verlag, 2007. 
 Maurice Halbwachs, sociologue retrouvé, ed. with Christian Baudelot. Paris, éditions Rue d’Ulm, 2007.
 [Maurice Halbwachs] et coll., Le Point de vue du nombre (1936), ed. with Eric Brian. Paris, Ined, 2005. 
 Médecines, patients et politiques de santé, Special issue of Actes de la recherche en sciences sociales, n. 143, June 2002.

French sociologists
Academic staff of the University of Tours
Year of birth missing (living people)
Living people
French women sociologists